Huodou (Chinese: 祸斗) is a legendary creature originating within the minorities of southern China.

Appearance
It is described as having the appearance of a large black dog that can emit flames from its mouth. Fire would break out wherever the Huodou went, so the ancients saw it as a sign of fire and often an ominous symbol. It is probably a demonized tribal symbol of southern China.

The "Shanhaijing" states: "There are people and beasts in the south who eat fire. Their country is near Hei Kunlun (Black Kunlun). People there can eat coals, and fire-eating beasts are also known as Calamities." The Shanhaijing also mentioned that the body of the Huodou is black.

It is also noted in the Chiya(赤雅) of the Ming Dynasty: "the Huodou looks like a dog, it eats fire and spits fire, it is ominous".

References

Chinese legendary creatures
Mythological canines
Mythological dogs